The women's 20 kilometres walk event at the 2015 African Games was held on 15 September.

Results

References

20
2015 in women's athletics